Asterix and Obelix is a French live-action film franchise, based on the comic book series of the same name by French comic book artists Albert Uderzo and Rene Goscinny. The series includes five theatrically released films. Just like the comic books, the films focus on the adventures of Asterix and Obelix, two Gauls in Roman-occupied Europe. With the help of a magic potion which causes superhuman strength, the Gaul's tiny village manages to resist Rome.

In the first two installments in the franchise, protagonists Asterix and Obelix are played by actors Christian Clavier and Gérard Depardieu. Depardieu is the only actor to appear in all four films, with Clavier being replaced by Clovis Cornillac for the third film and by Edouard Baer for the fourth. Apart from Depardieu and Clavier, the only other actors to appear in more than one film are Sim, who plays the village's oldest resident, Geriatrix, in the first and third film, and Jamel Debbouze, who plays Egyptian architect Edifis in the second and third films. All other roles who reappear during the series are played by a different actor in each film.

The fourth film, Asterix and Obelix: God Save Britannia, was released in 2012. A fifth film, Asterix & Obelix: The Middle Kingdom, commenced production in 2021 and is to be released in 2022.

Films

Asterix and Obelix vs. Caesar (1999)

Asterix and Obelix vs Caesar is the first live action Asterix film and it describes the adventure of the Gauls against the Roman Empire. The plot is based on the Asterix albums by René Goscinny and Albert Uderzo. The cast includes several famous actors and many well known French ones. The main stars are Christian Clavier, Gérard Depardieu, Roberto Benigni, Michel Galabru, Claude Piéplu. The film was directed by Claude Zidi, and it was very successful in France and other European countries.
Main cast members are:

Asterix & Obelix: Mission Cleopatra (2002)

In Asterix & Obelix: Mission Cleopatra, Asterix and Obelix travel to Egypt to help architect Numerobis to build a palace for queen Cleopatra in 90 days because of a bet she made with Julius Caesar.

For this film the plot is based primarily on the sixth Asterix comic book, Asterix and Cleopatra written by René Goscinny and illustrated by Albert Uderzo. The same comic book was the basis of a 1968 animated film. In this version there are many references to other popular movies like The Matrix, and contemporary jokes which give a different perspective from the previous stories.  Clavier and Depardieu reprised their roles as Asterix and Obelix but there were various other changes in the cast and crew of this film, such as Claude Piéplu and Gottfried John who played Getafix and Caesar in the first film being replaced by Claude Rich and Alain Chabat. The film was again a huge success but it was considered to be one of the most expensive films in the history of Europe (more than 50 million dollars). It was directed by Alain Chabat.

This movie is the only Asterix live action movie in which the plot closely follows the plot of the original comic book Asterix and Cleopatra without incorporating elements from other stories.

Asterix at the Olympic Games (2008)

Astérix at the Olympic Games is the third live action Asterix film, released in 2008, and based on the comic book of the same name. Clovis Cornillac replaced Christian Clavier in the role of Asterix. Aside from Gérard Depardieu as Obelix and brief cameos by Sim as Geriatrix and Jamel Debbouze as Edifis none of the cast members from the previous two films returned. The film does have several celebrity cameo appearances by people such as Tony Parker, Zinedine Zidane and Michael Schumacher.

Filming began in June 2006 and the movie was planned to be released close to the date of the Beijing Olympic Games. The budget of the film was estimated to be even higher than the previous Asterix film (possibly almost twice as expensive). It was directed by Frédéric Forestier and Thomas Langmann.

Asterix and Obelix: God Save Britannia (2012)

Asterix and Obelix: God Save Britannia is the fourth live action Asterix film, and was released in October 2012. It is based on the comic book Asterix in Britain. Edouard Baer replaced Clovis Cornillac (who had replaced Christian Clavier) in the role of Asterix.

Asterix & Obelix: The Middle Kingdom (2023)

Asterix & Obelix: The Middle Kingdom will be the fifth live action Asterix film. Production was originally planned to take place partly in China in 2020, but was postponed to 2021 and relocated to France and Morocco.  The film is being directed by Guillaume Canet, who also stars as Asterix, while Gilles Lellouche plays Obelix.

References

External links 

At Asterix NZ:
Astérix et Obélix contre César
Astérix & Obélix: Mission Cléopâtre
Astérix aux jeux olympiques

Film series introduced in 1999
1990s French-language films
Asterix films
Live-action films based on comics
Film series based on comics
1990s French films
2000s French films